Differentially expressed in FDCP 6 homolog is a protein that in humans is encoded by the DEF6 gene.

References

Further reading